The City of Fremantle is a local government area in the south of Perth, Western Australia.

History
The City of Fremantle is named after Charles Fremantle, who in 1829 claimed for George IV "all that part of New Holland (Australia) which is not included within the territory of New South Wales", but who was also charged just three years earlier in April 1826 with raping a 15-year-old girl. In 1848 a town trust was formed comprising a chairman and a committee of five. For the next twenty-three years they set about constructing roads and many public buildings with the use of convict labour. By 1870 the population of Fremantle had reached 3,796 and it was a moderately flourishing town, resulting in a move among the colonists to secure greater control of the management of their affairs.

The Municipality of Fremantle was formed on 21 February 1871, with the new council having a chairman and nine councillors. Two of the major achievements of the town council were a reliable supply of pure water and a more efficient system of sanitation. By 1928 Fremantle had a population of 22,340 and an annual revenue of £73,354enough to warrant a claim for city status. The City of Fremantle assumed its current name when city status was conferred upon Fremantle on 3 June 1929 as a Centenary of Western Australia honour.

North Fremantle, originally part of Fremantle, broke away in October 1895 to become an independent municipality. The first mayor of North Fremantle was Daniel Keen Congdon. The two municipalities were reunited by an order of the Governor in Executive Council as from 1 November 1961.

Wards
The City is divided into six wards, each electing two councillors. Each councillor serves a four-year term, and half-elections are held every two years. The mayor is directly elected.

 North Ward
 Hilton Ward
 South Ward
 Beaconsfield Ward
 City Ward
 East Ward

Mayors of Fremantle

The mayor of Fremantle as of October 2021 is Hannah Fitzhardinge, who is a member of the Australian Labor Party.

Suburbs
The suburbs of the City of Fremantle with population and size figures based on the most recent Australian census:

East Fremantle has its own town council and is not governed by the City of Fremantle.

Population

 The 1961 population of the former Town of North Fremantle was 2,363.

Economy 
The economy of the city is highly stable and diversified with various local businesses trading successfully in the vicinity. The key industries include port and shipping, regional and state government services, hospital and community services, tourism, education, retail, etc. In 2014, over 4,472 registered businesses were operating in the city and the size of the workforce in the city centre had reached 8,849 in 2011.

Sister city relations

Fremantle has sister city relationships with five other cities. They are (in chronological order):
  Seberang Perai, Malaysia (since 1978)
  Yokosuka, Japan (since 1979)
  Capo d'Orlando, Italy (since 1983)
  Molfetta, Italy (since 1984)
  Funchal, Portugal (since 1996)

Fremantle also has friendship-city relationships with three cities:
  Surabaya, Indonesia (since 1996)
  Padang, Indonesia (since 1996)
  Korčula, Croatia (since 1999)

See also
 Fremantle Town Hall

References

External links
 

 
Fremantle
Naming controversies